Zhao Peng (born 20 June 1983) is a retired Chinese footballer.

Club career
Zhao Peng rose to prominence when he was part of the team that helped Henan Jianye win promotion to the Chinese Super League after winning the second tier. The following season saw Zhao play an integral part in the Henan team that saw them fight against relegation throughout much of the season, eventually aiding them in a twelfth-place finish. The following season would see Zhao help establish Henan within the league and by the 2009 league season he would display some impressive performances for Henan that placed the club in their highest ever position of third and entry to the AFC Champions League for the first time.

Along with Yi Teng and Zeng Cheng, Zhao transferred to Guangzhou Evergrande for a fee of ¥20 million on 1 January 2013. On 10 May 2013, he made his debut for Guangzhou in a 3–0 away victory against Shanghai Shenhua, coming on as a substitute for Rong Hao in the 77th minute. He failed to establish himself within the team and spent most of his time in the bench. 
On 16 June 2014, Zhao was loaned to fellow top-tier side Changchun Yatai for the rest of the 2014 season. However, he didn't make any appearances for Changchun that season due to lingering injuries.

On 14 February 2015, Zhao transferred to China League One side Qingdao Jonoon.
On 11 March 2015, Zhao transferred to China League Two side Chengdu Qbao.

On 23 February 2019, Zhao Peng officially announced his retirement from professional football.

International career
Zhao made his debut for the Chinese national team in a 1–1 draw against Germany on 29 May 2009. He would play in several further friendlies and even score his first goal in a 4–1 win against Botswana on 30 September 2009.

Career statistics

International goals

Honours

Club
Henan Jianye
China League One: 2006

Guangzhou Evergrande
Chinese Super League: 2013
AFC Champions League: 2013

International
China PR national football team
East Asian Football Championship: 2010

Individual
Chinese Super League Team of the Year: 2009

References

External links

Player stats at sohu.com website

1983 births
Living people
People from Bengbu
Chinese footballers
Footballers from Anhui
China international footballers
Henan Songshan Longmen F.C. players
Guangzhou F.C. players
Changchun Yatai F.C. players
Qingdao Hainiu F.C. (1990) players
Shaanxi Chang'an Athletic F.C. players
Chinese Super League players
China League One players
2011 AFC Asian Cup players
Association football midfielders